Stefano Giuseppe Arne Vecchia Holmquist (born 23 January 1995) is a Swedish professional footballer who plays as a second striker or left-winger for Malmö FF in Allsvenskan.

Career statistics

Club

References

External links
Brommapojkarna profile 

 

1995 births
Living people
Swedish people of Italian descent
Association football forwards
IF Brommapojkarna players
IK Sirius Fotboll players
Swedish footballers
Allsvenskan players
Superettan players
Vasalunds IF players
Rosenborg BK players
People from Solna Municipality